Japan Air System Flight 451 was a Japan Air System flight from Nagoya Airport in the Nagoya area of Aichi Prefecture, Japan to New Chitose Airport in Sapporo, Hokkaido Prefecture, with a stopover at Hanamaki Airport in Hanamaki, Iwate Prefecture. On April 18, 1993, the Douglas DC-9-41 operating the flight crashed while landing at Hanamaki Airport.

The aircraft suddenly lost a significant amount of airspeed as it crossed the boundary line of a passing cold front, and encountered resultant windshear while on final approach. The somewhat inexperienced first officer was not able to conduct a missed approach fast enough to avoid a hard landing. The plane then skidded off the runway.

All 72 passengers and five crew members survived, with 19 people sustaining injuries. The aircraft caught fire as the passengers evacuated; it was destroyed and written off.

References

External links

 Final report (Archive) - Aircraft Accident Investigation Commission 

Aviation accidents and incidents in 1993
Aviation accidents and incidents in Japan
Accidents and incidents involving the McDonnell Douglas DC-9
Japan Air System accidents and incidents
April 1993 events in Asia